Alan Hargreaves (born 1931) is an English former professional footballer who played as a forward.

Career
Born in Thornhill, Hargreaves played for Bradford City.

For Bradford City he made 3 appearances in the Football League.

Sources

References

1931 births
Living people
English footballers
Bradford City A.F.C. players
English Football League players
Association football forwards